Rush Rhees (19 March 1905 – 22 May 1989) was an American philosopher. He is principally known as a student, friend, and literary executor of the philosopher Ludwig Wittgenstein. With G. E. M. Anscombe he was co-editor of Wittgenstein's posthumous Philosophical Investigations (1953), and, with Anscombe and G. H. von Wright, he co-edited Wittgenstein's Remarks on the Foundations of Mathematics  (1956). He was solely responsible for the editing of  Philosophical Grammar (1974) and Philosophical Remarks (1975). Rhees taught philosophy at Swansea University from 1940 until 1966, when he took early retirement to devote more time to editing Wittgenstein's works.

Early life and studies

Rush Rhees was born on 19 March 1905 in Rochester, New York. He was the son of Harriet Chapin née Seelye (the daughter of Laurenus Clark Seelye) and her husband (Benjamin} Rush Rhees, a Baptist minister, author and president of the University of Rochester and, via the latter, the great-great-grandson of the radical Welsh-born preacher and pamphleteer Morgan John Rhys. Rhys, who fled to America from Wales in 1794 to avoid prosecution, was befriended and helped by Benjamin Rush. Rhys's appreciation was such that he named his second son Benjamin Rush Rhees (the surname having changed after emigration).

Rhees began studying philosophy at Rochester, aged 16, in 1922. As a sophomore, he was expelled from his ethics class by Professor George M. Forbes, who had "found his questionings rude and insolent." This controversy, which occurred in February 1924 while Rhees' father was out of the country, was reported on the front page of The New York Times. Rhees would withdraw from the university and leave for Scotland soon after.

Rhees matriculated at the University of Edinburgh later in 1924 where he was particularly influenced by John Anderson. He graduated with a first-class honours degree in philosophy there in 1928. 

That same year he was appointed assistant lecturer, under J. L. Stocks, at the University of Manchester. This was a position he held for four years. 

He then studied with Brentano scholar Alfred Kastil at the University of Innsbruck for a year. 

In 1933 he became a research fellow at the University of Cambridge. While at Cambridge, he studied as a Ph.D. candidate under G. E. Moore. Rhees impressed Moore, who once described him as his ablest student, although Rhees proved unable to submit a dissertation. 

Ray Monk reports that Rhees "had, at first, been put off attending Wittgenstein’s lectures by the mannerisms of Wittgenstein’s students." Rhees had however overcome these misgivings by February 1936 from which point he attended all the remaining lectures of that year. And, as Monk notes, he soon became one of Wittgenstein’s closest friends, remaining so until Wittgenstein’s death.

Though, as Mario Von Der Ruhr notes, it "marked the beginning, not just of a deep friendship, but of an intense philosophical conversation," Rhees' time as a formal student of Wittgenstein was rather short. Rhees returned to Manchester as a temporary Assistant Lecturer in 1937 then left academia to work as a welder in a factory until 1940.

Career
Rhees taught philosophy at Swansea University from 1940 to 1966. He has been known mainly as a Wittgenstein exegete and for his influence on his friends, colleague Peter Winch and former student and his literary executor D. Z. Phillips. He was responsible for editing but also developing the legacy left by Wittgenstein, at times emphasising religious and ethical understandings of Wittgenstein's work, reflecting how Wittgenstein himself sometimes said he wanted to be understood. Together with G. H. von Wright and G. E. M. Anscombe he was appointed by Wittgenstein as his literary executor. He was also Wittgenstein's personal executor.

Rhees was also influential in bringing the work of other philosophers to greater attention, notably for example the French philosopher, Simone Weil. For a time, he was visiting Professor at King's College London, and with Winch and Norman Malcolm formed a 'formidable triumvirate' of Wittgensteinans.

Rhees returned to Swansea in 1982 after the death of his first wife Jean Henderson. In 1985 he would re-marry to artist and designer (Margaret) Peg Smythies, the widow of Wittgenstein disciple Yorick Smythies and the ex-wife of Barry Pink, a friend of Yorick's who had also been a friend to Wittgenstein during the last year of his life.

At Swansea Rhees continued to teach, leading weekly post-graduate seminars from 1983 and, in the Cambridge tradition, welcoming a few students in 'at home' sessions for more detailed discussions of their research work. He also attended weekly meetings of the University's Philosophical Society that he had founded around 1940 (and which had counted Wittgenstein as chief amongst the eminent philosophers who addressed it in the years when Rhees was still a lecturer). It was also a forum in which students were expected to test and sharpen their philosophical wits. It was clear in these seminars that Rhees was not only devoted to exegesis of one of the finest thinkers of the twentieth century, but was, in fact, constantly absorbed in developing his own profound insights in philosophy. He was self-effacing of his capacities and had to be persuaded to accept an honorary professorship at Swansea where he had previously turned down promotion during his teaching career.
 In 1966 he took early retirement from the university to devote more time to editing Wittgenstein's works.

Rhees died on 22 May 1989, and is buried at Oystermouth Cemetery in Mumbles near Swansea. 

A volume of essays in Rhees' honour was published that same year. Numerous posthumous collections of Rhees' published works, notes and manuscripts appeared under the editorship of D. Z. Phillips in the years that followed. 

Rhees' papers are held by Swansea University Archives.

Works
Books
Without Answers (1969)
Discussions of Wittgenstein (1970)
Nachlass works prepared for publication by D. Z. Phillips:
On Religion and Philosophy (1997)
Wittgenstein and the Possibility of Discourse (1998, 2nd edition 2006)
Moral Questions (1999)
Discussions of Simone Weil (1999)
Wittgenstein's On Certainty: There - Like Our Life (2003)
In Dialogue with the Greeks (2004) 
Volume I: The Presocratics and Reality 
Volume II: Plato and Dialectic 
Select papers and book chapters
 "Ontology" and Identity in the Tractatus', in Studies in the Philosophy of Wittgenstein, ed. Peter Winch, (1969)

 "Wittgenstein on Language and Ritual", in Wittgenstein and His Times, ed. Brian McGuiness, (1982)

Edited works

(incomplete)

(Co-)edited works by Wittgenstein:

 with G.E.M. Anscombe, Philosophical Investigations, (1953), G.E.M. Anscombe (trans.)
 with G. H. von Wright and G. E. M. Anscombe, Remarks on the Foundations of Mathematics, (1956), G. E. M. Anscombe (trans.), Oxford, revised edition 1978.
 The Blue and Brown Books: Preliminary Studies for the “Philosophical Investigations, (1958) with an introduction by Rhees. 
 Philosophical Remarks, (1974), R. Hargreaves and R. White (trans.).
 Philosophical Grammar, (1975), A. Kenny (trans.),

Other edited works:

Studies in Logic and Probability (1952), a selection of works by George Boole with an introduction by Rhees
Ludwig Wittgenstein: Personal Recollections (1981) with a postscript by Rhees
*For a more complete list of major works published during his lifetime see "Rush Rhees: Main Publications" in Wittgenstein: Attention to Particulars (1989)

References

Analytic philosophers
Wittgensteinian philosophers
University of Rochester alumni
1905 births
1989 deaths
Academics of Swansea University
People from Rochester, New York
Alumni of the University of Edinburgh
American philosophers
American emigrants to the United Kingdom
British philosophers
British people of American descent
American expatriates in Scotland